Tomás Maldonado (25 April 1922 – 26 November 2018) was an Argentine painter, designer and thinker, considered one of the main theorists of design theory of the legendary Ulm Model, a design philosophy developed during his tenure (1954–1967) at the Ulm School of Design (Hochschule für Gestaltung – HfG) in Germany.

Early life 
Born in the Argentine city of Buenos Aires, Maldonado's artistic formation took place at Escuela Nacional de Bellas Artes Prilidiano Pueyrredón.

Career

The early years 
In this early period he was involved with the Argentine Avant Gardes, in fact, he was one of the founders of the painters' movement called Arte Concreto-Invención.

The Italian experience 
Between 1964 and 1967, in collaboration with his German colleague Gui Bonsiepe he created a system of codes for the design program of the Italian firm Olivetti and the department store La Rinascente.  In 1967 he established himself in Milan, continuing to teach in the Faculty of Philosophy and Literature of the University of Bologna, working almost entirely now in philosophy and criticism influenced by semiotics.  In one of his last essays, "The Heterodox", he claims that the role of the intellectual is to awaken or reveal the collective conscience.

The academic career 
 Tomás Maldonado was professor of Environmental Design (Progettazione Ambientale) at Politecnico di Milano University.
 Between 1954 and 1966 he taught at the Ulm School of Design (Hochschule für Gestaltung: HfG) in Germany and served as both Rector and Prorector. The leading contributor to the "Ulm Model", Maldonado oriented design education towards systems-thinking to attain a balance between science and design, and between theory and practice, incorporating planning methods, perceptual theory and semiotics, A description of the approach is his essay entitled, "Ulm, Science and Design".
 In 1965 he was the "Lethaby Lecturer" at London's Royal College of Art. The following year, he became a Council of Humanities Fellow at Princeton.
 Between 1967 and 1970 he taught the "Class of 1913" chair at Princeton's School of Architecture (SoA).
 In 1971 he was appointed to the philosophical faculty of Bologna University. Between 1976 and 1984 he worked as full professor of Environmental Design (Progettazione Ambientale) at University of Bologna's Faculty of Humanities and Philosophy.
 In 2012 he was granted the Konex Special Mention for his trajectory in Visual Arts of Argentina.

Selected works 
 Max Bill, Editorial Nueva Visión, Buenos Aires 1955
 Ulm, Science and Design (1964)
 La Sperenza Progettuale (1970); Eng. trans.: Design, Nature, and Revolution: Toward a Critical Ecology (1972, 2019)
 Industrial Design reconsidered
 Is Architecture a Text?
 Towards an Ecological Rationalism
 Technique and Culture, the German debate between Bismarck and Weimar
 The Heterodoxo (1998)

References

Further reading

External links 

 Tomás Maldonado at Centro Virtual de Arte Argentino (CVAA)

Argentine painters
Argentine male painters
Argentine contemporary artists
Design researchers
Design educators
Argentine philosophers
People from Buenos Aires
1922 births
2018 deaths
Academic staff of the Ulm School of Design
Academic staff of the Polytechnic University of Milan
Argentine expatriates in Germany
Compasso d'Oro Award recipients
Casabella editors